The gyaling (English: also spelled , , , , , ,  etc.), literally "Chinese flute", is a traditional woodwind instrument used in Tibet. As its name indicates, it is the Chinese double reed Suona horn (much like the Iranian sorna) used mainly in Tibetan monasteries during puja (chanting and prayer) and is associated with peaceful deities and the idea of devotion.

Design 
The gyaling is oboe-like in appearance with a long hardwood body and copper brass bell.  The instrument is generally covered with ornate embellishments of colored glass.  The double reed, which is made from a single stem of marsh grass, is placed upon a small metal channel that protrudes out of the top. There are eight (8) fingerholes on a standard gyaling.

To play a gyaling requires a technique called circular breathing, in which the instrument will constantly be emitting a linear sound, even while the musician inhales. The reed is fully submerged in the player’s mouth but does not touch it; the lips are pressed against the flat metal channel below the reed.  A gyaling player tunes the instrument with the breath.   The way of playing a gyaling varies depending on the lineage and ritual.

Usage in ritual 
A typical Tibetan Buddhist ritual orchestra consists of a gyaling, dungchen,  kangling, dungkar (conch shells), drillbu (handbells), silnyen (vertical cymbals), and most importantly, chanting.  Together, the music creates a state of mind to invite or summon deities.

Often, the style of performance is similar to that of a bagpipe, with many short and fast neighbor tones.

Gallery

See also 
Music of Asia
Shawm
Suona
Sorna
Tibetan Buddhism

References

External links
Clip of traditional Tibetan music
Informational gyaling video on circular breathing

Single oboes with conical bore
Tibetan musical instruments